Strangea cynanchicarpa is a shrub of the family Proteaceae native to Western Australia.

References

Flora of Western Australia
cynanchicarpa
Plants described in 1855
Taxa named by Carl Meissner